The NE-Z8000 is a Brazilian homebuilt computer clone of the Sinclair ZX81, introduced in late 1982 by Prológica's subsidiary, the monthly magazine Nova Eletrônica.

General Information 

The NE-Z8000 computer is based around a Z80A CPU clocked at 3.6 MHz with 1KB of RAM (expandable to 16 KB). The 8KB ROM comes with a built-in Sinclair BASIC interpreter.

The machine has three input plugs, one socket for composite video out and a part of the exposed circuit board where you can connect extra equipment. It has no switch; to turn it on, you simply plug it into the power supply. The video connector cable, about 120 cm long, should connect the computer to the television. A power supply provides 9V DC power usable by the machine.

The NE-Z8000 is considered rare, and in 2013 it could be auctioned by as much as R$1000.

Bibliography 

Nova Eletrônica. São Paulo: Editele, 1982, Edição Nº 70, pp. 122.

References 

Prológica
Computer-related introductions in 1982
Early microcomputers
Goods manufactured in Brazil
Sinclair ZX81 clones